Ommatoiulus lusitanus is a species of milipede endemic to Portugal. It predominantly inhabits grassland but also occurs in Cistus litter.

References

Julida
Millipedes of Europe
Endemic arthropods of Portugal
Animals described in 1895